Roštár is a village and municipality in the Rožňava District in the Košice Region of middle-eastern Slovakia.

History
In historical records the village was first mentioned in 1318.

Geography
The village lies at an altitude of 343 metres and covers an area of 8.549 km².

Population
On 31 December 2011, it had a population of 551 people.

Culture
The village has a public library and a gymnasium

References

External links
 Roštár
https://web.archive.org/web/20070513023228/http://www.statistics.sk/mosmis/eng/run.html

Villages and municipalities in Rožňava District